The New 7 Wonders of the World was a campaign started in 2001 to choose Wonders of the World from a selection of 200 existing monuments. The popularity poll via free Web-based voting and small amounts of telephone voting was led by Canadian-Swiss Bernard Weber and organized by the New 7 Wonders Foundation (N7W) based in Zurich, Switzerland, with winners announced on 7 July 2007 in Lisbon, at Estádio da Luz. The poll was considered unscientific partly because it was possible for people to cast multiple votes. According to John Zogby, founder and current President/CEO of the Utica, New York-based polling organization Zogby International, New 7 Wonders Foundation drove "the largest poll on record". 

The program drew a wide range of official reactions. Some countries touted their finalist and tried to get more votes cast for it, while others downplayed or criticized the contest. After supporting the New 7 Wonders Foundation at the beginning of the campaign by providing advice on nominee selection, the United Nations Educational, Scientific, and Cultural Organization (UNESCO), bound by its bylaws to record and give equal status to all world heritage sites, distanced itself from the undertaking in 2001 and again in 2007.

The seven winners were chosen from 21 candidates, which had been whittled down from 77 choices by a panel in 2006. 

The New 7 Wonders Foundation, established in 2001, relied on private donations and the sale of broadcast rights and received no public funding. After the final announcement, New 7 Wonders said it did not earn anything from the exercise and barely recovered its investment. Although N7W describes itself as a not-for-profit organization, the company behind it—the New Open World Corporation (NOWC)—is a commercial business. All licensing and sponsorship money is paid to NOWC.

The foundation ran two subsequent programs: New 7 Wonders of Nature, the subject of voting until 2011, and New7Wonders Cities, which ended in 2014.

The campaigns and the organization are sometimes spelled as multiple words and sometimes as a single word.

Winners

The Great Pyramid of Giza, largest and oldest of the three pyramids at the Giza Necropolis in Egypt and the only surviving of the original Seven Wonders of the Ancient World, was granted honorary status.

Reactions

United Nations
In 2007, the New 7 Wonders Foundation contracted a partnership with the United Nations in recognition of the efforts to promote the UN's Millennium Development Goals. 

However, the United Nations Educational, Scientific and Cultural Organization (UNESCO), in a press release on June 20, 2007, reaffirmed that it has no link with the initiative.  The press release concluded:

Brazil
In Brazil there was a campaign Vote no Cristo (Vote for the Christ) which had the support of private companies, namely telecommunications operators that stopped charging voters to make telephone calls and SMS messages to vote.  Additionally, leading corporate sponsors including Banco Bradesco and Rede Globo spent millions of reals in the effort to have the statue voted into the top seven.  Newsweek reports the campaign was so pervasive that:

According to an article in Newsweek, around 10 million Brazilians had voted in the contest by early July. This number is estimated as the New 7 Wonders Foundation never released such details about the campaign. An airplane message, with a huge inscription "4916 VOTE FOR CHRIST" flew in Rio de Janeiro for a month.

Peru
An intensive campaign led by the Peruvian Ministry of Commerce and Tourism in Peru had a great impact in the media and consequently, Peruvian people voted massively for its national wonder.  The announcement of the new World Wonders generated great expectations and the election of Machu Picchu was celebrated nationwide.

Chile
The Chilean representative for Easter Island's Moais, Alberto Hortus, said Weber gave him a letter saying that the Moais had finished eighth and were morally one of the New 7 Wonders. Hortus said he was the only participant to receive such an apology.

India
A campaign to publicize the Taj Mahal in India gathered speed  and it reached a climax in July 2007 with news channels, radio stations, and many celebrities asking people to vote for the Taj Mahal.
Taj mahal is in Agra,India.

Jordan
Queen Rania Al-Abdullah of Jordan joined the campaign to back Petra, Jordan's national treasure.

Mexico
There was a campaign on the news programs to encourage people to vote for Chichen Itzá.

Other finalists
The other 13 finalists, chronologically were:

See also
Wonders of the World
Seven Wonders of the Ancient World
Eighth Wonder of the World
World Heritage List – a list of over 900 sites deemed by UNESCO to be of "outstanding universal value"

References

External links

Cultural lists
New7Wonders of the World
Projects established in 2000
Projects disestablished in 2007

de:Weltwunder#„Die neuen sieben Weltwunder“